Bad governance is the relationship between those who govern and those who are governed as a consequence of decision-making. This unfavourable relationship is created as a consequence of external factors or decisions such as violation of central or acceptable norms, such as those of liberal democracy, and bad economic policy:. Bad governance collectively encompasses governance in government and corporate settings. It is the opposite of good governance. Bad governance addresses governance in a government setting but bad governance and bad government are different concepts. Bad governance encompasses a variety of situations from corruption, deceit and to passing of unfair policy. From this, it can be noted that different manifestations of bad governance can vary in severity and the potential impact in their respective setting. The World Bank has identified key indicators of governance which are used as a method to measure bad governance.

Bad governance is centralised around the idea of not only corruption within a system but a lack of transparency and accountability, arbitrary policy making and the cheating of those who are governed.



Definition 
The World Bank defines bad governance as a country which "holds the figures of any or all of the indicators less than and close to −2.5". The World Bank governance indicators are:

 Voice and Accountability
 Political Stability and Absence of Violence
 Government Effectiveness
 Regulatory Quality
 Rule of law
 Control of Corruption

Causes 
Based on the World Bank's governance indicators, the key causes for Bad Governance are:

Lack of Voice and Weak Accountability
Governing bodies refusing to listen the voice of those they govern and refusing to take accountability for their actions leads to bad governance. By ignoring the voice of those being governed, their opinions are no longer heard or taken into consideration by the governing body. Democratic governments focus on accountability as a method to ensure the public understands  what´s happening and provides them a way to proceed when things go wrong. Weak accountability in turn causes a distrust between the two parties and can lead to instability. This distrust and uncertainty creates an unfavourable relationship between the parties.

Political Instability 
Bad Governance occurs as a consequence of frequent changes in government or 'political instability'. Instability in political regimes, such as a democracy, has been proven to coincide with poor governance.

Corruption 

Bad Governance, is often considered to come hand in hand with corruption. Corruption occurs in many sectors ranging from political to economic environments.  Corruption can occur in many different ways and forms. The existence of corruption within a governing body causes bad governance as the officials places their personal gains over others.

Impact of Bad Governance 
The impacts and consequences of bad governance are widespread and don't only effect the settings in which they occur:

Poor Economic Growth 
Bad governance heavily impacts the per capita growth of a country. African countries has experienced this impact the most since World War II. The economic growth of a country is significantly impacted when exposed to indicators of bad governance but difference indicators influence the degree of impact. A lack in regulatory quality, governments ineffectiveness and a lack of control on corruption have been linked to poor economic growth.

Failed State 
When the public administration cannot provide many public services, and the citizens do not recognize that their government is not legitimate, then the state would become a failed state. This thing leads the whole nation to bloodshed and suffering.

Corruption 
Corruption not only is a cause of but can also occur as a consequence of bad governance. There was a distinct link suggested that that higher levels of governance and a better environment to conduct business are impacted by the presence of corruption within an economy. This link suggests that has levels of governance in an economy due to bad governance, the levels of perceived corruption will rise.

Solutions to Bad Governance

Transparency 
The World Bank Institute has suggested that through introducing reforms that address transparency,  the degree of bad governance and be levitated and good governance can slowly take precedence. These reforms include

 Disclosure to the public of all assets and income of candidates running for public office
 Disclosure to the public of all political contributions to parties along with all documentation related to legislation and voting in parliament.
 Clear separation of laws relating to areas of governance e.g. business, politics etc.
 Release publicly any company that has been blacklisted due to bribery 
 Ensure access by the public to all government information
 Ensure media has a freedom of speech
 Implementation of International Monetary Fund's (IMF's) reports on standards and codes framework   
 Release of government reports on payment from extraction industries along with open meetings between two entities if country's citizens are involved.
 Domestic bank's owners and financial reports are opened to the public
 Competitive procurement (over the internet) by governing entities is available to public
 Introduction of governance and anti corruption surveys supported by World Bank
 Budgets and meetings at the city level are transparent

Dealing with Corruption 
A strong correlation exists between bad governance and corruption. By curbing corruption within governing bodies bad governance can be reduced. There are three ways to reduce corruption:

Introduction of New Institutions and Laws 
Corruption occurs usually due to the weak or a lack of anti-corruption laws and institutions in place. Bad governance by governing entities rely on pre-existing laws or norms which lack anti-corruption methods to get away or explain corrupt to foreign criticism. In these cases by introducing either stronger or new anti-corruption laws or institutions that change or monitor these old laws corruption can be monitored and curbed. Starting these new institutions and laws is an attempt to push the governing bodies in the correct direction by removing the worst features first and not immediately remove corruption from the body. However, governing entities, as research has shown, are most likely to attempt adopting new institution and laws but are forced back by withholding political tools necessary.

Target Vulnerable Services 
The World Bank and macro economists tend to view corruption in a governing bodies as a whole and don't take into consideration the differences corruption that the different services within the body are susceptible too. Reforms to these individual services within a body which impose anti-corruption regulates, act to curb corruption.

Change Service at Grass Roots 
Nine principles can be applied to help deal with corruption by disturbing the laws and institutions that provide the opportunity for officials to act with motives of self gain. This disruption is initiated by national policymakers using their power to change laws and institutions.

Repeal Laws that facilitate the collection of bribes 
The laws and regulations affect the process of services provided by governing bodies. The larger the amount of stages in the process, the more opportunities governing officials have to delay and impede the process. If the entity requesting the service require a quick claim the most effective way to remove the delays by the governing bodies is by paying a bribe. By minimising the amount of regulations and the amount of steps in the process governing bodies have less opportunities to impede the process.

Increase the use of objective criteria for deciding eligibility for recovering a service 
A list of criteria is needed for each service provided to determine whether or not a person is allowed to use it. To ensure that this process of determining if someone is able to use the service is impartial, applying criteria which is objective is the best method. By increasing the number of objective criteria in services that rely on evaluation, such as the education system, the room for corruption and bribery is decreased.

Use computers to reduce contact with public officials 
Bribery is one of the most common forms of corruption. The normal method of bribery occurs in hand-to- hand trades of cash. Such a trade means a face-to-face transaction needs to occur between the two parties. By increasing the use of computers in services the face-to-face element is removed from the transaction. This eliminates the opportunity for public officials to benefit through bribery as they aren't presented the chance.

Monitor the delivery of services electronically 
Corruption and fraud often occur hand-in-hand. Public officials who collect bribes are likely to defraud their agency by being away from the office. Collecting timesheets electronically enables agencies to check computerised data to verify the work being completed by public officials.

Give citizens access to public records about themselves 
Public officials keep computer files relating to requests received from citizens and the process on that request. By enabling the public to have access to these files, citizens that have made requests for a service are able to monitor what is happening in the process. This will provide transparency to the process enabling citizens to take specific actions depending on process of there request.

Match the supply of services to entitlements and obligations 
Laws and regulations establish who is entitled to public services, such as education and health care. The resources to meet theses entitlements are provided by the government to the public, such as teachers and nurses. The allocation of entitlements to the public by the government becomes and issue when the demand for the entitlements becomes greater than the supply. The lack of supply can mean that to meet the necessary demand the quality or standard of the services provided drop (doctor reduce the time spent on examining patients). By correctly matching the entitlements and the obligations a drop in a quality can be avoided.

Expand Choice 
The government holds a monopoly over some of the services it provides, such as official documentation. Other public services that they offer, such as healthcare, education and pensions, can be offered by "non-for-profit organisations and by private-sector enterprises". By expanding the choices not only can the public select an option better suited to themselves, if there is corruption within one of the sectors, alternative options are available so that the corruption can be avoided.

Legalise some payments for public services 
Legalising payments for public services that are currently free will mean that the illegal charge, the bribe, will be legalised in a similar fashion to the principle of discount airlines. The higher the price paid for the public service, the better treatment the citizen will receive for that service.

Align public laws and informal standards  
Informal standards of public opinion do not always align with the public laws that determine how governing bodies should deliver public services. Corporations can abide by the law and use tax loopholes to avoid paying large amounts of tax and the activity isn't considered corrupt in a legal sense. In the public opinion, the same activity can be considered corrupt as corporations avoid tax for private gain.

References  

Governance
International development
Political science terminology